Sultana Kamal (10 December 1952 – 15 August 1975), nicknamed Khuki, was a Bangladeshi athlete. She was married to Sheikh Kamal, the eldest son of Bangladesh President Sheikh Mujibur Rahman. She was killed during the assassination of Sheikh Mujibur Rahman family.

Education and sports
Kamal was a student of the University of Dhaka. She held national records in long jump and 100-metres.

Legacy
In 2011, Bangladesh Women's Sports Association introduced the Sultana Kamal Independence Day Award for the contributors to Bangladesh's women's sports.

Eponyms
 Sultana Kamal Women's Complex – a sports complex in Dhanmondi, Dhaka
 Athlete Sultana Kamal Hall – a female student dormitory for Institute of Leather Engineering and Technology under the University of Dhaka
Sultana Kamal Gymnasium - a gymnasium for the students of University of Khulna
Sultana Kamal bridge - a bridge at Demra.

References

1952 births
1975 deaths
Bangladeshi female athletes
University of Dhaka alumni
Assassination of Sheikh Mujibur Rahman
Deaths by firearm in Bangladesh
Sheikh Mujibur Rahman family